Tovačov is a town in the Přerov District in the Olomouc Region of the Czech Republic. It has about 2,400 inhabitants. The historic town centre is well preserved and is protected by law as an urban monument zone.

Administrative parts

The village of Annín is an administrative part of Tovačov.

Geography
It lies in the Upper Morava Valley. It lies at the confluence of the Morava and Bečva rivers. Mlýnský náhon, one of the Morava's branches, flows right through the town.

The area is rich in water bodies. There is a set of four fish ponds on the Mlýnský náhon, Hradecký Pond is the largest water body in Tovačov. In the vicinity of the confluence, there are four artificial lakes created in the 1950s after gravel mining.

History
The first written mention of Tovačov is from 1203. Shortly after its founding, it became an important crossroads of trade routes leading along the rivers. The most notable owners of the Tovačov estate were the Cimburk family (1349–1502), the Pernštejn family (1503–1597), the Salm family (1600–1715), and the Küenburg family (1763–1887).

The first ponds were founded here in 1464 by Jan Tovačovský of Cimburk. During the rule of the Pernštejns, another ponds were founded. The ponds were damaged in the Thirty Years' War and abolished in the 18th century. They were partially renewed after the World War II.

Tovačov is the site of a minor battle in the Austro-Prussian War. On 16 July 1866, the Prussians defeated the Austrians in the Battle of Tobitschau.

Sights

The town can be characterized as the oldest Renaissance urban establishment in the country. The town square was founded in 1475. Among the most valuable monuments is the town hall with a Renaissance portal. The fountain on the town square is from 1692.

The main landmark is the Tovačov Castle. It was originally a fortress from the second half of the 11th century and later a water fortress, rebuilt by the Cimburk family in the 15th century. Its Renaissance portal from the same year is the oldest Renaissance monument north of the Alps.

The synagogue from the 15th century and the Jewish cemetery belong to the oldest in the Czech Republic. Today the former synagogue serves as a prayer houses of the Czechoslovak Hussite Church.

There is the Memorial of the Battle of Tobitschau near Hradecký Pond.

Notable people
Sidonie Grünwald-Zerkowitz (1852–1907), Austrian writer, poet and fashion designer
Hugo Kauder (1888–1972), Austrian composer and pedagogue
Klement Slavický (1910–1999), composer
Rudolf Bereza (1942–2014) dissident

References

External links

Populated places in Přerov District
Cities and towns in the Czech Republic